Leoben Hauptbahnhof is the main station at Leoben, a city in the federal state of Styria in Austria. The station is located on the Bruck an der Mur–Leoben railway. West of the station, the Rudolf Railway branches off to the north.

Services
 the following services stop at Leoben Hauptbahnhof:

 Nightjet:
 overnight service between Graz and Zürich.
 InterCity: service to Vienna, Graz, and Villach.

References

External links 
 

Railway stations in Styria
Leoben